Vegas Vacation is a 1997 American comedy film directed by Stephen Kessler in his feature directorial debut. It is the fourth installment in National Lampoon’s Vacation film series, and was written by Elisa Bell, based on a story by Bell and Bob Ducsay. The film stars Chevy Chase, Beverly D'Angelo, Randy Quaid, Wayne Newton, Ethan Embry, and Wallace Shawn. It tells the story of Clark Griswold taking his family to Las Vegas to renew his vows to Ellen as the usual hilarity occurs. The film opened at #4 at the box office and grossed over $36.4 million domestically. Vegas Vacation is the first theatrical Vacation film not to carry the National Lampoon label or a screenwriting credit from John Hughes.

Plot
After the food preservative that keeps perishable items fresh for years which he helped make has been approved, Clark Griswold finally earns the sizable cash bonus promised to him in the previous film from Frank Shirley. He announces to his family that he is taking them on vacation to celebrate and renew wedding vows with his wife Ellen. Excitement wanes, however, when Clark says they are headed to Las Vegas. His wife and teenage daughter, Audrey, have their doubts, as Las Vegas is not known for its family-friendly atmosphere, while teenage son Rusty appears to be more enthusiastic.

Upon arriving in Vegas, the family embarks upon a series of misadventures. The Griswolds attend a Siegfried & Roy show, and they also visit Cousin Eddie, the husband of Ellen's cousin Catherine. Eddie and his family now live in the desert just north of Las Vegas, on what used to be a hydrogen-bomb test site. While on a group tour of the Hoover Dam led by guide Arty, Clark becomes separated from the group after accidentally creating a leak in the dam's interior walkways, and is forced to climb the scaffolding to the very top of the dam to get out, because his cries for help cannot be heard over the roaring water. The next night, they are surprised to find tickets to a Wayne Newton concert have been delivered to their hotel room, along with a dress for Ellen. They go to the concert, only to realize that Newton had sent the dress. While singing, he brings Ellen up on stage to sing with him, and visits at their table.

The next day, the family agrees to an "alone day" and are left to their own devices. Clark goes to a casino and becomes addicted to gambling, usually losing to a snide blackjack dealer named Marty, who enjoys Clark's humiliation. Rusty buys a fake ID from a Frank Sinatra look-alike and becomes a winning high roller, taking on the pseudonym Nick Pappagiorgio. Audrey starts hanging out with Eddie's free-spirited exotic dancer daughter Vicki and her friends. Ellen begins spending time with Wayne Newton, who has feelings for her.

Clark gambles away the family's $22,600 bank account, leading a furious Ellen and the kids to desert him. Rusty wins four cars from four separate slot machines, while Audrey goes to a strip club with Vicki and gets a job as a go-go dancer. Eddie — who has money buried in his front yard — tries to come to Clark's rescue in return for everything the Griswolds have done for him and his family over the years. Clark and Eddie go to a local casino to get their money back, but Clark ends up gambling away Eddie's money too, causing him to re-evaluate his behavior. Clark then realizes he no longer cares about getting his money back, but needs to get his family back.

Clark then gathers up his family from around Vegas and they gamble their last two dollars on a game of keno. They sit next to an elderly man who compliments Clark on his family, and hints that he has been lonely all of his life. Out of sympathy, Clark tells the man to consider himself part of the Griswold family for the night. The man happily accepts Clark's offer, and both parties begin the game. At first, the Griswolds are optimistic, but as they realize they have already lost the game, they sit together in silence. Suddenly, the man next to them ecstatically declares that he has won the game. In his burst of joy, he suddenly begins to slip in and out of consciousness while Ellen sends Rusty for help. He revives long enough to whisper a message to Clark, before dropping his winning ticket. Clark, confused, tells Ellen that the man said "take the ticket" as the old man winks toward him while lapsing one last time. When the casino security guards and paramedics arrive, they declare the man officially dead. They tell the Griswolds that his name was Mr. Ellis and he would have given anything for a friend. As Mr. Ellis is carried away, a janitor approaches with a carpet cleaner, heading straight for the winning ticket on the floor. Though it appears Clark is going to allow it to be lost, at the last second, he slides the ticket out of the carpet cleaner's path.

With their newfound winnings, Clark and Ellen renew their wedding vows in the presence of Eddie's family. Clark then gives Eddie $5,000 to repay his kindness. The Griswolds all drive home in the four cars Rusty won on the slot machines: a red Dodge Viper, a maroon Ford Mustang, a black Hummer H1, and a white Ford Aspire.

Cast

 Chevy Chase as Clark W. Griswold
 Beverly D'Angelo as Ellen Griswold
 Ethan Embry as Russell "Rusty" Griswold. He was portrayed by Anthony Michael Hall, Jason Lively, and Johnny Galecki in the previous films.
 Marisol Nichols as Audrey Griswold. She was portrayed by Dana Barron, Dana Hill, and Juliette Lewis in the previous films.
 Randy Quaid as Eddie Johnson, the cousin-in-law of Clark and Ellen
 Wayne Newton as himself
 Wallace Shawn as Marty
 Miriam Flynn as Catherine Johnson, the cousin of Ellen and wife of Eddie
 Siegfried & Roy as themselves
 Sid Caesar as Mr. Ellis
 Shae D'lyn as Vicki Johnson. She was previously portrayed by Jane Krakowski in the first film.
 Juliette Brewer as Ruby Sue Johnson. She was previously portrayed by Ellen Hamilton Latzen in the previous film.
 Zack Moyes as Denny Johnson
 Christie Brinkley as "Girl in the Red Ferrari"
 Julia Sweeney as Mirage desk clerk
 Toby Huss as a Frank Sinatra impersonator who Rusty gets a fake ID from.
 Jerry Weintraub as "Jilly from Philly"

Production

Filming
John Hughes did not return for Vegas Vacation, as he did not have any further National Lampoon stories to adapt, as he had with the original Vacation and Christmas Vacation. He also had shown dissatisfaction with how the series had essentially turned into a star vehicle for Chevy Chase and noted that Warner Bros. had never even told him that they were making the movie, only hearing about it by reading a trade magazine. When approached by disappointed fans, Hughes insisted that he "had nothing to do with it!"

Filming was initially scheduled to begin in Las Vegas in April 1996. Filming was later scheduled to begin on May 29, 1996. Most of the filming was expected to be done in southern Nevada, while approximately 10 days of work was planned for studios in southern California. Filming in Las Vegas was expected to last two and a half months. Filming at Hoover Dam was underway in June 1996. One scene involved Chase's stunt double, John Robotham, swinging from a rope and slamming into the face of the dam. Film crews did several takes of the scene, which involved Robotham being attached to a series of ropes and bolts 637 feet above the dam's power plant. Later that month, filming took place at Las Vegas' Chapel of the Bells, where the film's producer Jerry Weintraub and his wife Jane Morgan were married in the mid-1960s. Weintraub appears in the film as "Gilly from Philly", the gambler who befriends Rusty.

Extensive footage was shot at The Mirage resort; owner Steve Wynn closed portions of the property to allow for filming, which included the resort's diving dolphins and its Siegfried & Roy show. Chase filmed scenes involving the show's tigers in July 1996. Filming also took place on soundstages at the Las Vegas Video Sound Film Production Center. Scenes were also shot at Casa de Shenandoah, the home of entertainer Wayne Newton. Other filming locations included the MGM Grand Las Vegas, the Klondike Hotel and Casino, O'Sheas Casino, the Neon Museum, and Fremont Street Experience.

Nichols and Embry became the fourth different set of actors to play the Griswold children, Audrey and Rusty. This fact is referenced early in the film when Clark Griswold comments that he hardly recognizes his children anymore.

Reception

Box office
Vegas Vacation was released to cinemas in the United States on February 14, 1997. The film was later released on home video and to television.

Critical response
Vegas Vacation received negative reviews. It has garnered a rating of 16% on Rotten Tomatoes based on 32 reviews. The critic consensus states, “The Vacation franchise hits rock-bottom in this corny and tepid trip to sinfully laugh-free city.” According to review aggregation website Metacritic, which it was assigned a 20 out of 100 based on 10 reviews, the film received “generally unfavorable reviews.” The film was nominated for The Sequel Nobody Was Clamoring For at the 1997 Stinkers Bad Movie Awards but lost to Free Willy 3: The Rescue.

See also
 List of films set in Las Vegas

References

External links

 
 
 

1997 films
1997 comedy films
American comedy films
American sequel films
Films scored by Joel McNeely
Films about vacationing
Films set in Chicago
Films set in the Las Vegas Valley
Films shot in California
Films shot in the Las Vegas Valley
Films shot in Nevada
Films about gambling
National Lampoon's Vacation (film series)
Warner Bros. films
1997 directorial debut films
1990s English-language films
1990s American films